Raftery is a surname originating in Ireland, predominantly in County Mayo, County Galway and County Roscommon. Edward MacLysaght observes that 'Raftery, sometimes confused with Rafferty, is quite a different name', originating as 'O'Reachtaire', 'reacht' meaning 'decree'.

Famous Rafterys
Adrian Raftery (born 1955), Irish and American statistician and sociologist
Adrian Raftery (author) (born 1971), Australian author, journalist, businessman and lecturer
Andrew Raftery (born 1962), American contemporary printmaker, painter and arts educator
Antoine Ó Raifteiri (Anthony Raftery) (blind Irish language poet)
Barry Raftery (1944–2010), Irish archaeologist and Celtic scholar
Bill Raftery (born 1943), American basketball analyst and former college basketball coach
Mary Raftery (1957–2012), Irish investigative journalist, filmmaker and writer
Pat Raftery (disambiguation), several people with this name
Peter Raftery (1929–1996), High Commissioner to Botswana
Ronan Raftery, Irish actor
Tom Raftery (born 1933), Irish politician
Tom Raftery (baseball) (1881–1954), American baseball player
W. C. Raftery (1887–1965), American football, basketball and baseball coach

References

Anglicised Irish-language surnames